The second season of the American television comedy Abbott Elementary created by Quinta Brunson premiered in the United States on ABC on September 21, 2022, is set to conclude in 2023, and will consist of twenty-two episodes. Like the first, the season stars Brunson, Tyler James Williams, Janelle James, Lisa Ann Walter, Chris Perfetti, William Stanford Davis and Sheryl Lee Ralph.

Abbott Elementary is presented in a mockumentary format similar to one of The Office and Parks and Recreation, and follows a documentary crew recording the lives of teachers working in underfunded schools including the fictional Willard R. Abbott Elementary School, a predominantly Black Philadelphia public school.

Like the first season, the season was widely praised by critics and audiences alike with universal acclaim. The season currently holds a 100% approval rating on Rotten Tomatoes. The success of the series led to a renewal by ABC for a third season in January 2023.

Cast and characters

Main 
 Quinta Brunson as Janine Teagues
 Tyler James Williams as Gregory Eddie
 Janelle James as Ava Coleman
 Lisa Ann Walter as Melissa Schemmenti
 Chris Perfetti as Jacob Hill
 William Stanford Davis as Mr. Johnson
 Sheryl Lee Ralph as Barbara Howard

Recurring 

 Zack Fox as Tariq Temple 
 Kate Peterman as Tina Schwartz 
 Lauren Weedman as Kristin Marie Schemmenti 
 Keyla Monterroso Mejia as Ashley Garcia 
 Zakai Biagas Bey as Clarence 
 Courtney Taylor as Erika 
 Nate' Jones as Amber 
 Erika T. Johnson as Venus 
 Jerry Minor as Mr. Morton 
 Vince Staples as Maurice

Guest

Episodes

Production

Development 

The series was renewed for a second season by ABC in March 2022, just months prior to the first season concluding. In July 2022, the season was confirmed to consist of 22 episodes, nine more than the first. Production companies Delicious Non-Sequitur, 20th Television and Warner Bros. Television returned for the season, with Fifth Chance joining them having not produced the first season. A trailer for the season was released onto YouTube and various series social media accounts on September 1, 2022. Quinta Brunson is expected to host Saturday Night Live on April 1, in promotion of the series.

The series was later renewed for a third season in January 2023. When speaking of the third season renewal, Channing Dungey, chairman and CEO of Warner Bros. Television Group had this to say:

Brunson, Halpern, Schumacker and Einhorn are all expected to return as executive producers.

Casting 

In March 2022, upon renewal for its second season, all main cast members from the first season were confirmed to return for the second, including; Quinta Brunson as Janine Teagues, Tyler James Williams as Gregory Eddie, Janelle James as Ava Coleman, Lisa Ann Walter as Melissa Schemmenti, Chris Perfetti as Jacob Hill and Sheryl Lee Ralph as Barbara Howard.

In July 2022, just months prior to the series returning, it was announced that William Stanford Davis, who had recurred during the first season as Mr. Johnson, would be promoted to series regular for the second season. Additionally, Zach Fox reprised his role as Tariq Temple for two episodes, while Nikea Gamby-Turner and Reggie Conquest returned as Shanae and Devon respectively, cafeteria workers at Abbott. Both Gamby-Turner and Conquest appeared as co-starring cast members in the first season, but were upped to regular guest starring cast members for the second.

Additionally, a week before the season premiere it was announced via The Wrap that the season would see the introduction of various recurring guest stars, including Lauren Weedman as Kristen Marie, Leslie Odom Jr. as Draemond Winding and Keyla Monterroso Mejia as Ashley Garcia. All of whom appeared within the first eight episodes of the season.

The season features a cameo from Philadelphia Flyers mascot Gritty in the premiere episode, which garnered a large amount of online attention. When asked by the National Hockey League, executive producer Patrick Schumacker stated that Gritty's appearance in the series was "a long time coming." He revealed that Gritty was originally due to appear in one of the early episodes of the first season, but scheduling conflicts delayed the cameo.

The season also saw developments of the relationship between Janine and Gregory. With the two characters almost sharing a kiss during "Holiday Hookah", before being interrupted by Amber, Gregory's girlfriend and Janine learning of Gregory's crush during "Valentine's Day". When asked about their relationship, Lisa Ann Walter stated:

In addition to the development of their relationship, Nate' Jones returned as Amber, who appeared as a guest star during the first season, upped to a recurring character for the second. She begins dating Gregory which contributes to the awkwardness of his feelings for Janine.

In July 2022, while production of the second season was still in the early stages of filming, rapper Vince Staples jokingly asked to be cast in the series in a Twitter post to which Brunson replied "1. I’m not done writing 2. Come get your hat". Staples ultimately appeared during the "Holiday Hookah" episode, portraying Maurice, while also featuring Golden State Warriors player Andre Iguodala who portrays himself in a cameo. Staples returned in a few episodes throughout the season, becoming a recurring character. Orlando Jones returned in the season, portraying Gregory's father Martin. Jones' casting was widely praised, due to his physical similarities with Williams, who portrays Gregory.

On February 6, 2023, it was confirmed that Ayo Edebiri would recur as Ayesha, Janine's sister. While currently only mentioned in various episodes and appearing in a FaceTime call during "Valentine's Day", Edebiri will return as Ayesha for a more expansive role later in the season.

Filming 
In a tweet made by Quinta Brunson, it was revealed that production on the second season had commenced on July 18, 2022. Like the first season, the interior scenes of the series are filmed at  Warner Bros. Studios, Burbank in Burbank, California, with exterior shots of the series being filmed in front of Vermont Elementary School in Los Angeles. Brunson confirmed in a tweet that filming for the season finale episode took place on January 24, 2023. Filming for the season ultimately concluded six days later on January 30, 2023.

Reception

Critical response 

On Rotten Tomatoes, the season has received an approval rating of 100% with an average rating of 9 out of 10, based on 11 reviews. The site's critical consensus reads, "Class is back in session and the plucky teachers of Abbott Elementary remain an absolute delight, with creator/star Quinta Brunson's savvy and sweet sensibility honed to perfection." Meanwhile, Metacritic has reported an average rating of 90 out of 100, based on eight reviews, indicating "universal acclaim".

Days before the season premiered, Daniel D'Addario of Variety praised Abbott Elementary by stating, "Abbott does the teachers at its center justice, and is proof of Brunson’s ability to put familiar forms to worthy and delightful ends. Like a good student, the series colors, vividly, within the lines." In response to the season premiere, Samantha Nelson of IGN stated, "Abbott Elementary defends its spot as one of the funniest and most heartwarming shows on television with its Season 2 premiere. A new school year provides a great opportunity for characters to grow and change, facing new challenges with the same mix of clever quips and earnest enthusiasm that makes the sitcom’s ensemble cast so loveable."

Audience response 
The season, just like the first, received overwhelming support from fans and celebrities alike; including Keke Palmer and Henry Winkler. The most notable support being from actor Brian Tyree Henry, who responded to a joke made about him during the "Wrong Delivery" cold open. He sent his supports sending flowers and a written note to Brunson personally; Henry was mistaken for actor Brian Austin Green by Barbara Howard during the scene. In addition, media personality, rapper and host of the The Joe Budden Podcast Joe Budden acknowledged his name being mentioned during the "Read-a-Thon" episode, stating in a Twitter post; "Nah don’t gas me.. I love that show lol."

Ralph was an honorable mention for "TVLine Performer of the Week" for the fifteenth episode in the season, "Fire", with the authors giving praise to her performance and stating, "This week’s Abbott Elementary gave Emmy Award winner Sheryl Lee Ralph another chance to show off her impressive comedy chops. - Ralph brought the typically composed teacher to the brink, delivering increasingly hilarious and ridiculous declarations with determined energy (“I never listen to Chaka Khan’s ‘Through the Fire’ when it comes up on my Pandora. I'm every woman, not a pyromaniac”)."

Ratings 
The season premiered on September 21, 2022, following premiere episodes of The Conners and The Goldbergs. The second season moves it’s time slot from Tuesday at 9:00 p.m. (EST) to Wednesday at 9:00 p.m. (EST). The premiere episode "Development Day", received a total of 4.30 million viewers after 35 days of multi-platform viewing, 73% higher than the pilot which garnered 3.67 million viewers in total. The episode became the highest viewed episode of an ABC series since the series finale of Modern Family. "Read-a-Thon" would later top the viewership of the first episode, bringing to 4.34 million viewers after 35 days of multi-platform viewing.

Notes

References

External links 

Abbott Elementary
2022 American television seasons
2023 American television seasons